Uruagu is a town in Nnewi North, Anambra State, Nigeria. Uruagu as we know is the second quarter among the four quarters of Nnewi town. Others are Otolo, Umudim and Nnewichi.

References

Nnewi